Ilya Salman may refer to:

İlyas Salman, Turkish actor
Ilya Salmanzadeh, Swedish-Iranian musician

See also
Salman (name)